Peter Young Kaʻeo Kekuaokalani (March 4, 1836 – November 26, 1880) was a Hawaiian high chief (aliʻi) and politician of the Kingdom of Hawaii. His cousin was Emma, who contended for the throne after the death of Kamehameha. After being diagnosed with leprosy, he was exiled in 1873 to Kalaupapa, the isolation settlement on Molokaʻ. He was later permitted to return to Honolulu, where he died.

Life 
Peter was born March 4, 1836, at Paloha, Honolulu on the island of Oʻahu. His mother was Jane Lahilahi, the youngest daughter of John Young Olohana, the advisor to Kamehameha I, and Chiefess Kaʻōanaʻeha. His father was Joshua Kaʻeo, judge of the Supreme Court of Hawaii, and great-great grandson or great grandson of King Kalaniopuu.

He was adopted at birth by his maternal uncle John Kalaipaihala Young, according to Hawaiian tradition of hānai. His uncle was the fourth Kuhina Nui and the Minister of the Interior. Kaeo was declared eligible to succeed to the Hawaiian throne by Kamehameha III and attended Chiefs' Children's School because of his descent from Keliʻimaikaʻi, Kamehameha III's uncle. The school was run by Amos Starr Cooke and Juliette Montague Cooke, an American missionary couple.

Kaeo served as a member of the House of Nobles 1863–1880, and on the Privy Council of King Kamehameha IV 1863–1864. He contracted leprosy, now known as the Hansen's disease, which was incurable at the time. He was exiled  to the leper colony at Kalaupapa on the island of Molokaʻi. He arrived June 29, 1873, traveling on the same boat as William P. Ragsdale, a part-Hawaiian attorney who had served as interpreter for the government and in the legislature. Kaeo had the means to maintain a comfortable life, including the work of two servants, but was aware of the poverty and desperation around him.

During his exile at Kalaupapa, he and his cousin Emma Kaleleonalani, at the time Queen Dowager, exchanged letters revealing their personal lives during this three-year period. In addition, these recount the affairs of the Hawaiian Kingdom during the same period of time, expressed in their own words and reflecting their status as Hawaiians. They commented on island politics, dynastic intrigues, inter-ethnic rivalries and animosities, American-Hawaiian diplomatic strains, and frustrations during a time of national crisis. They wrote 122 letters now held in Hawaiian historical archives.

For example, from Peter Kaeo to Queen Emma, August 11, 1873:
Deaths occur quite frequently here, almost dayly. Napela (the Mormon elder and assistant supervisor of the Kalaupapa Settlement) last week rode around the Beach to inspect the Lepers and came on to one that had no Pai [taro] for a Week but manage to live on what he could find in his Hut, anything Chewable. His legs were so bad that he cannot walk, and few traverse the spot where His Hut stands, but fortunate enough for him that he had sufficient enough water to last him till aid came and that not too late, or else probably he must have died.

On November 26, 1880, Kaeo died at Honolulu at the age 44, after being released from Kalawao in 1876. The Hawaiian Gazette, December 1, 1880, said: "The Hon. P. Y. Kaeo died at his residence on Emma Street on Friday night [November 26, 1880]. The funeral took place on Sunday and was largely attended by the retainers and friends of the family. The hearse was surrounded by Kahili-bearers as becomes the dignity of a chief."

He was interred in the Royal Mausoleum of Hawaii at Mauna ʻAla, along with many of the Young family members. His remains were moved along with political advisor Robert Crichton Wyllie and other members of Queen Emma's family to the newly build Wyllie Tomb in June 1904.

Family tree

References

Bibliography

 

 
 
 

 

 
 
}

 
 

1836 births
1880 deaths
Deaths from leprosy
Princes of Hawaii
Royalty of the Hawaiian Kingdom
Infectious disease deaths in Hawaii
Members of the Hawaiian Kingdom House of Nobles
Members of the Hawaiian Kingdom Privy Council
Hawaiian adoptees (hānai)
Royal School (Hawaii) alumni